My Faithful Husband is a 2015 Philippine television drama romance series broadcast by GMA Network. It premiered on the network's Telebabad line up and worldwide on GMA Pinoy TV from August 10, 2015 to November 13, 2015 replacing The Rich Man's Daughter.

Mega Manila ratings are provided by AGB Nielsen Philippines.

Series overview

Episodes

August 2015

September 2015

October 2015

November 2015

References

Lists of Philippine drama television series episodes